Foerster Peak is a mountain, broadly east of the Half Dome area of Yosemite National Park.

Foerster Peak was named for Lewis Foerster, US military who was on duty in Yosemite in 1895.

From most directions, Foerster Peak is a  climb; some are —.

On Foerster Peak's locale

Foerster Peak is one of three Sierra Peaks Section listed peaks on along the boundary separating southeastern Yosemite from the Ansel Adams Wilderness.

Foerster Peak is loosely southeast of Half Dome and Clouds Rest, and is east of Mount Starr King. Foerster Peak is loosely northwest of Electra Peak. It is southwest of Mount Ansel Adams, loosely northeast of Gray Peak, and Red Peak. It is loosely southeast of Mount Florence, southwest of Mount Lyell and Rodgers Peak, is west of Mount Ritter, is northeast of Merced Peak. Foerster Peak is also southeast of Lake Merced and Merced Lake High Sierra Camp, and Washburn Lake. Foerster Peak is east of Mount Clark. Quartzite Peak is nearby.

References

External links and references

 On a hiking route, which passes through the area

Mountains of Yosemite National Park
Mountains of Madera County, California